Buckland is in the Franklin ward of Auckland Regional Council, on the south-east side of Pukekohe, between Pukekohe and Tuakau, and on the northern boundary of Waikato District. It is part of the Pukekohe urban area.

Buckland is probably named after a local land owner. The 2010 publication, Place Names of New Zealand, says that was Alfred Buckland, but in 2017 the Specialist Built Heritage Unit of Auckland Council named William Thorne Buckland.

There is a church, opened in 1900, a hall and a primary school. Buckland had a railway station from 1875 to 1969.

Demographics

Buckland had a population of 1,173 at the 2018 New Zealand census, an increase of 132 people (12.7%) since the 2013 census, and an increase of 204 people (21.1%) since the 2006 census. There were 384 households, comprising 588 males and 585 females, giving a sex ratio of 1.01 males per female. The median age was 40.7 years (compared with 37.4 years nationally), with 246 people (21.0%) aged under 15 years, 222 (18.9%) aged 15 to 29, 528 (45.0%) aged 30 to 64, and 177 (15.1%) aged 65 or older.

Ethnicities were 82.1% European/Pākehā, 16.1% Māori, 4.1% Pacific peoples, 10.0% Asian, and 2.0% other ethnicities. People may identify with more than one ethnicity.

The percentage of people born overseas was 17.4, compared with 27.1% nationally.

Although some people chose not to answer the census's question about religious affiliation, 55.2% had no religion, 33.8% were Christian, 0.5% had Māori religious beliefs, 2.6% were Hindu, 0.3% were Muslim, 0.5% were Buddhist and 1.0% had other religions.

Of those at least 15 years old, 150 (16.2%) people had a bachelor's or higher degree, and 183 (19.7%) people had no formal qualifications. The median income was $37,200, compared with $31,800 nationally. 234 people (25.2%) earned over $70,000 compared to 17.2% nationally. The employment status of those at least 15 was that 501 (54.0%) people were employed full-time, 153 (16.5%) were part-time, and 24 (2.6%) were unemployed.

Education
The school opened in 1894.

It is about 1.3 km northeast of Buckland.

Both schools are coeducational. Rolls are as of

Other Bucklands in New Zealand
Buckland is also the name of small settlements east of Cambridge, in the Waikato region, and north east of Feilding.

References 

Populated places in the Auckland Region